"Drugs or Jesus" is a song written by Brett James, Troy Verges, Aimee Mayo and Chris Lindsey, and recorded by American country music singer Tim McGraw. It was released in January 2005 as the third single from his album Live Like You Were Dying.  It peaked at number 14, thus becoming his first single since "Two Steppin' Mind" in 1993 to miss the top ten (not counting "Tiny Dancer").

Content
The narrator talks about how in his hometown, people follow their own paths in life and either choose drugs or Jesus.

Critical reception
Kevin John Coyne, reviewing the song for Country Universe, gave it a positive rating. He says that the song is one of McGraw's best performances ever.

Music video
The music video was directed and produced by Sherman Halsey, and premiered on CMT on January 21, 2005. It shows McGraw walking through an old house. He does not wear a cowboy hat, but rather a knit cap.

Chart positions

Year-end charts

References

2005 singles
2004 songs
Tim McGraw songs
Songs written by Brett James
Songs written by Chris Lindsey
Songs written by Aimee Mayo
Songs written by Troy Verges
Song recordings produced by Byron Gallimore
Song recordings produced by Tim McGraw
Curb Records singles
Music videos directed by Sherman Halsey
Country ballads